Martín García García (born 3 December 1996) is a Spanish classical pianist. In 2021, he won third prize at the XVIII International Chopin Piano Competition and first prize at the Cleveland International Piano Competition.

Biography 
Martín García García studied with Galina Eguiazarova at the Reina Sofía School of Music in Madrid and with Jerome Rose at the Mannes School of Music in New York.

References 

1996 births
Living people
Spanish classical pianists
21st-century Spanish musicians
21st-century classical pianists
Prize-winners of the International Chopin Piano Competition